The SEAT 128 is a 3-door hatchback coupé from the Spanish automaker SEAT launched in 1976. Being essentially the three-door hatchback version of the Fiat 128, it was available with two engine options in Spain, the 1.2L and the more powerful and well-known 1430 engine. The design of the SEAT 128 was made in Spain by SEAT engineers, and was marketed as "Three Times SEAT" in order to underline its triple combination ability of sportiness, versatility and design. The car was aimed at rich, young drivers, however, the 128 never enjoyed great commercial success, since in a period of economic recession and transition in Spain most people opted for the smaller, less expensive SEAT 127.

Technical data
SEAT 128 (1977)

References

128

Cars introduced in 1976
Hatchbacks